School Council (abbreviated as SC) is a feature in public schools and education colleges in Myanmar. It is the system of teacher-student joint council with House system under the control of the government, in which all the students and teachers of a school or an education college have to participate, and the principal take the highest position. The School Councils are formed under the order and regulation of Myanmar government's Ministry of Education, Department of Basic Education. A School Council comprises five houses. Secretary is the highest position that a student can be elected. Vice-chairman is the highest position that a teacher can be elected. The highest position; the chairman is only for the headmaster/headmistress or the principal.

The School Council had been mandatorily formed since Ne Win's reign with various structures in each school. In June and July 2013, school councils were reorganized, with many activities and the aim to build Democracy inside classes and schools.

In the first week of a new academic year, students are allocated to five Houses, either randomly or by drawing lots or by the management of the teacher.
Each of the houses has a colour and the formal name named after a king or a hero. But there is no specific uniform for houses. The houses are often called informally by their colours colloquially. 
Members of each of the five houses usually have to do duties, such as sweeping, on each weekdays that their house is assigned.

Usually, the houses have to compete with one another in many aspects. The flags of the houses are flied on the right  side of the bar attached to the flag pole, with the flag of house that has highest score at the highest position and the flag of house that has lowest score at the lowest position.

History

In Basic Education schools, the Students Council had been organized since the Socialist Era. The houses competed in cleaning, sports, etc., and had been very active, but later, the group activities became weak because of the examination-based education system.

Current reorganization 
The Ministry of Education planned to reorganized the school councils before July 2013. The reorganized school council would have a general secretary, the houses' leaders, and even student representatives. The Ministry hoped that the school council would help students to learn leadership skills and improve personality, and would strengthen the unity of  students.

Purposes of formation of the Student Council

The five houses and duty-days
(Originally, there were only four houses, but a new house was added later to become five houses.)

During the three Vassa months (ဝါတွင်း ;Wa Twin), Blasic   Education schools (public schools) close on Uposatha Days(ဥပုသ်နေ့ ;Uputh Ne); 8th Waxing Days, Full Moon Days, 8th Wanning Days and New Moon Days on Myanmar Calendar, and open on the following Saturday as substitution, unless an Uposatha Day coincide with a Saturday, Sunday or public holiday. In this case, the house assigned on the Uposatha Day is assigned on the following Saturday as substitution.

Structure

The School Council of a school is formed by all the students and teachers of that school, led by an executive committee with elected students and teachers and non-elected chairman the principal.

Students 

The five houses of the School Council are formed in every class of every standard of the whole of a school. In each class, a captain is elected for each house, and among the five house captains, the competent one has to serve both the class house captain duty and the class monitor duty, jointly.

Teachers 

All the teachers of the whole of a school have to become the members of the five houses in such a way as for every house has equal number of teachers, and each teacher-in-charge of each house is elected by voting.

The Executive Committee 

Different schools have different number of students so have different number of classes in each standard.
But the number of members in the executive committee of the School Council of a Basic Education Middle School or a Basic Education High School is fixed to a number.
It seems that the executive committee is not formed in the School Council of a Basic Education Primary School. Also even in a BEMS or a BEHS the executive committee members are not elected from primary school standards.

A Basic Education Middle School has Kindergarten to Eighth Standard, but the students from Kindergarten to Fourth Standard can not be elected to the executive committee.

A Basic Education High School has Kindergarten to Tenth Standard, but the students from Kindergarten to Fourth Standard can not be elected to the executive committee.

The Five Pledges

At schools in Myanmar, students have to shout the Five Pledges of the School Council after singing the National Anthem of Myanmar. The five pledges are as follow:

၁။မိမိကိုယ်ကိုကောင်းအောင်ကြိုးစားမည်။
၂။မိမိအတန်းကိုကောင်းအောင်ကြိုးစားမည်။
၃။မိမိ‌ကျောင်းကိုကောင်းအောင်ကြိုးစားမည်။
၄။မိမိတိုင်းပြည်အတွက်ကောင်းအောင်ကြိုးစားမည်။
Meaning:
1.(I) will try for myself to be good!
2.(I) will try for my class to be good!
3.(I) will try for my school to be good!
4.(I) will try for country to be good!

Flags

The flag pole must not be shorter than 20 ft, and at 5 ft from the top, a 6 ft bar has to be attached.
 On the right side of the bar, the small flags of the five houses are flied in the order of scores of the houses, with the flag of house that has highest score at the highest position and the flag of house that has lowest score at the lowest position.
 On the left side of the bar, the small flag of the house in-duty.

Democracy Inside School

 , . 
One of the slogans of School Council says "ကျောင်းတွင်းဒီမိုကရေစီထူထောင်မည်၊ ပြည်သူ့သားကောင်းသမီးကောင်းကျောင်းကောင်စီ" meaning "(We) will build the Democracy Inside School, the School Council : good sons and good daughters of the people!"

Elections
Members of a house elect a boy leader and a girl leader of their house. 
Students in a class elect a boy monitor and a girl monitor of the class. 
All members of a house in the whole school elect a representative of their house in the School Council.
Students in a standard elect a representative of their standard in the School Council.
Teachers in each house elect a teacher-in-charge of the house.
All students in the whole school elect the secretary of the School Council.
A teacher is elected to become the vice-chaiman.

References

Education in Myanmar
 
Student culture
 
Student politics
Student organizations
Student societies by activity
Student Council
Student government